Tony Tarantino (born July 4, 1940) is an American actor and producer. He is the father of filmmaker Quentin Tarantino.

Life and career
Tarantino was born in New York City, the son of Elizabeth Jean and Dominic James Tarantino, both of southern Italian ancestry. In a 2017 interview, Tony Tarantino spoke of an incident in 1960 when he was 20 years old and talent agent Henry Willson offered him acting opportunities and a lavish lifestyle in exchange for gay sex. Shocked, Tarantino says he punched Willson in the face, knocking Willson to the ground.  After Willson got up he told Tarantino he'd never work in Hollywood or New York again as an actor. Tarantino stated he was thereafter quickly fired from his role on the TV western series Dick Powell's Zane Grey Theatre.  Tarantino changed his name to Tony Maro and booked several acting jobs with Paramount as an extra, but says he was thrown off the lot within two hours once his true identity was discovered.

Tarantino is the father of film director Quentin Tarantino.  During a 2010 interview, the younger Tarantino said:  "Well, I never knew my father [...] That's the thing. I never knew him [...] He wanted to be an actor [...] Now he's an actor only because he has my last name. But he was never part of my life. I didn't know him. I've never met him."

Tarantino has produced such films as Prism and Underbelly Blues.

Political positions
In October 2015, his son Quentin Tarantino received backlash from police unions after speaking at an anti-police brutality rally in New York, saying: "I have to call the murderers the murderers." Tarantino responded, saying he had relatives in the police and that what Quentin had said was "dead wrong".

Filmography

As producer

As director

As actor

References

External links

1940 births
20th-century American male actors
21st-century American composers
21st-century American male actors
21st-century American male musicians
American cinematographers
American male composers
American film producers
American male film actors
American television actors
English-language film directors
Living people
Male actors from New York City
People from Queens, New York